"Honor Bound" is a song written by Tommy Rocco, Charlie Black and Austin Roberts, and recorded by American country music artist Earl Thomas Conley.  It was released in January 1985 as the second single from the album Treadin' Water.  The song was Conley's eighth number one country single.  The single went to number one for one week and spent a total of thirteen weeks on the country chart.

Critical reception
Kip Kirby of Billboard magazine reviewed the song favorably, calling it an "understated, impassioned statement on the dilemma of a woman bound only by honor; rhythm is slow and controversial."

Charts

Weekly charts

Year-end charts

References

1985 singles
1984 songs
Earl Thomas Conley songs
RCA Records singles
Songs written by Austin Roberts (singer)
Songs written by Charlie Black
Songs written by Tommy Rocco